Porter's Regiment was a militia regiment raised on January 19, 1776, under Colonel Porter at Northampton, Massachusetts and Pittsfield, Massachusetts for one year of service. The regiment would see action during the Invasion of Canada. The regiment was disbanded on January 1, 1777, at Morristown, New Jersey.

External links
Bibliography of the Continental Army in Massachusetts compiled by the United States Army Center of Military History

Massachusetts militia

The Continental Army, Richard Wright - see page 59